Espinosa de los Monteros is a municipality located in the province of Burgos, Castile and León, Spain, with a population of c. 2,100 inhabitants.

The village is spread over a large rural area at the southern outskirts of a mountainous area of the Cantabrian Mountains.

History

First settlements in the area date from the Bronze and Iron Age, but its modern settling and location officially started with the town charter given by Alfonso VI of León to repopulate it after its war destruction during the early 11th century.

It is home to the ancient Royal Guard of the "Gentlemen of the Chamber" since its founding in 1008 by Sancho García of Castile of the early local counts dynasty.

Espinosa is said to be the birthplace of Miguel de Espinoza's family name and origins, father of the philosopher Baruch Spinoza.

During Napoleonic Wars, The Battle of Espinosa de los Monteros, fought on 10 and 11 November 1808, resulted in a French victory under General Victor against Lieutenant General Joaquín Blake's Army of Galicia.

Main sights

Palacio de Chiloeches, in Renaissance style, built from 1600. It is characterized by a façade with two towers surmounted by small spires.   
Church of St. Eulalia
Church of St. Cecilia
Torre de los Velascos
Torre Berrueza
Torre de los Monters (14th century)
Fernández-Villa palace, in Renaissance style
Torre de los Azulejos (16th century)

Economy
The main activities and industries have been related to military career services, stockbreeding mostly of cattle and as a regional hub of transportation due its geography, currently are intensified around dairy products and as modern commercial and services local center of its area and smaller neighbor communities of the wider valley. It is developing a small recreation tourism focused in its rugged and preserved mountain attractions. In winter, due to its heavy snowfalls, it runs a modest ski resort mostly catering to the neighbor coastal major cities day and weekend tourism.

People from Espinosa de los Monteros
Juan de Salazar de Espinosa (1508–1560) - explorer, founder of the Paraguayan capital city of Asunción.

References

Municipalities in the Province of Burgos